DWQW (101.5 FM), broadcasting as Barangay FM 101.5, is a radio station owned and operated by GMA Network. The station's studio and transmitter are located at the GMA Broadcast Complex, Roxas Ave., Brgy. Concepcion Pequeña, Naga, Camarines Sur.

References

External links

Radio stations in Naga, Camarines Sur
Radio stations established in 1998
Barangay FM stations